is a national university primarily in the Kibana neighborhood of southern Miyazaki city, Miyazaki Prefecture, Japan. The name is sometimes shortened to the abbreviation "UoM" or the portmanteau "Miyadai." The predecessor of the school was founded in 1884, and it was chartered as a university in 2003. The university has undergraduate faculties in education and culture, regional innovation, medicine, engineering, and agriculture. The university also has graduate programs in agriculture, education, engineering, and medicine (inc. veterinary medicine).

The Center for International Relations provides several English-language guides directed at international students.

Faculties

Transportation

Bicycles
The University of Miyazaki offers multiple bicycle parking areas around the Kibana campus. Some areas are covered and some are not. Bicycles are not allowed in the central part of campus, only the periphery where cars also have access.

Cars, Motorcycles, and Mopeds
Automobiles are another popular form of transportation to the University of Miyazaki, and there are several parking lots positioned around the Kibana campus.

Walking
There are pedestrian paths (including sidewalks) leading in and out of the Kibana campus at multiple locations.

Public Transportation
The closest train station is Kibana Station (Kibana Eki). There is a bus stop on campus.

References

External links
Official website 
Official website 

Educational institutions established in 1884
Japanese national universities
Miyazaki (city)
Forestry education
Universities and colleges in Miyazaki Prefecture
1884 establishments in Japan